Bernard Smith (born 31 January 1964) is a New Zealand professional darts player who plays in events of the Professional Darts Corporation (PDC). He qualified for his debut appearance at the 2018 PDC World Championships by winning the 2017 Oceanic Masters in Dubbo, Australia in October 2017.

World Championship results

PDC
 2018: First round (lost to Justin Pipe 2–3)

Performance timeline

PDC

References

External links 
 Profile and stats on Darts Database

Living people
New Zealand darts players
1964 births
British Darts Organisation players
Professional Darts Corporation associate players